Visa requirements for Comorian citizens are administrative entry restrictions by the authorities of other states placed on citizens of Comoros.

As of 2 July 2019, Comorian citizens had visa-free or visa on arrival access to 51 countries and territories, ranking the Comorian passport 92nd in terms of travel freedom (tied with a passports from Bhutan and Chad) according to the Henley Passport Index.

Visa requirements map

Visa requirements

Dependent, disputed, or restricted territories

Unrecognized or partially recognized countries

Dependent and autonomous territories

Non-visa restrictions

See also
Visa policy of Comoros
Comorian passport

References and Notes
References

Notes

Comoros
Foreign relations of the Comoros